Manuel Pucciarelli (born 17 June 1991) is an Italian footballer who plays as a second striker or attacking midfielder for  club Vis Pesaro.

Career
Pucciarelli first began playing football in Jolly Montemurlo's youth sector. At 10 years old, he moved to Empoli; he played for their youth team in the 2009–10 Campionato Primavera final, scoring a goal in a 2–1 defeat to Genoa.

On 29 May 2011, Pucciarelli made his first-team debut in a 1–1 draw against Vicenza, replacing Mirko Valdifiori in the 60th minute. On 22 January 2012, he moved on loan to Lega Pro Seconda Divisione side Gavorrano, scoring 10 goals (including a brace against L'Aquila) in 17 appearances.

After his promotion to the Serie A with Empoli, Pucciarelli made his top flight debut against Udinese on 31 August 2014, replacing Levan Mchedlidze in the 83rd minute. He scored his first Serie A goal on 23 September against AC Milan.

On 11 July 2017, Pucciarelli was sent on a two-year loan to Chievo, with obligation for purchase.

On 31 January 2020, Pucciarelli joined Pescara on loan until the end of the 2019–20 season.

On 20 January 2021, Pucciarelli was loaned to Dibba Al-Furjarah in the UAE First Division League.

In September 2021, Pucciarelli joined Australian club Melbourne City on a two-year deal.

On 22 November 2022, Pucciarelli signed for Serie C club Vis Pesaro as a free transfer, agreeing a contract until the end of the season with an option to extend.

Style of play 
Pucciarelli is a second striker, who can also play as an attacking midfielder. He is good at creating attacking opportunities for his teammates, and is known for his endurance and pressing the opposing ball carrier.

References

External links
 
 
 Lega Serie B profile  

Living people
1991 births
People from Montemurlo
Sportspeople from the Province of Prato
Footballers from Tuscany
Italian footballers
Association football forwards
Association football midfielders
Empoli F.C. players
U.S. Gavorrano players
A.C. ChievoVerona players
Delfino Pescara 1936 players
Dibba FC players
Melbourne City FC players
Vis Pesaro dal 1898 players
Serie B players
Serie A players
UAE First Division League players
A-League Men players
Serie C players
Italian expatriate footballers
Italian expatriate sportspeople in the United Arab Emirates
Italian expatriate sportspeople in Australia
Expatriate footballers in the United Arab Emirates
Expatriate soccer players in Australia